Antiochus XIII Philadelphus, (Greek: Ἀντίοχος ΙΓ' Φιλάδελφος) known as Asiaticus, (Ἀσιατικός) was the penultimate ruler of the Seleucid kingdom.

Biography

He was son of king Antiochus X Eusebes and the Ptolemaic princess Cleopatra Selene of Syria, who acted as regent for Antiochus XIII after his father's death sometime between 92 and 85 BC. Some time after Tigranes had conquered Syria (83 BC), she traveled to Rome to have her sons recognized as kings of Egypt, but to no avail. However, between 75 BC and 73 BC, they were recognized as "Kings of Syria", and "maintained a royal state". Selene was eventually captured and killed by Tigranes. However, after the latter's defeat by Lucius Licinius Lucullus at the Battle of Tigranocerta, the residents of Antioch hailed Antiochus XIII as king, and Lucullus approved his appointment as client ruler of Syria (69 BC).

In 64 BC, Pompey had Antiochus XIII deposed and killed by a Syrian chieftain, Sampsiceramus I. Antiochus' death is traditionally said to have ended the Seleucid dynasty, but he was survived by Philip II Philoromaeus for a short time and by Seleucus VII Philometor until 58 BC, if the latter is identified with same prince who briefly married Berenice IV of Egypt.

See also

 List of Syrian monarchs
 Timeline of Syrian history

Notes

References 
 Peter Green, Alexander to Actium: The Historical Evolution of the Hellenistic Age (1990), pp. 552, 553, 658, 659
 Edwyn R. Bevan, The House of Seleucus (1902), p. 263

External links 

 Antiocus XIII Asiaticus entry in historical sourcebook by Mahlon H. Smith
Intaglio representing Antiochus XIII-Numéro d'inventaire: camée.156
 

 

64 BC deaths
1st-century BC Seleucid rulers
Antiochus 13
1st-century BC rulers in Asia
Year of birth missing
Antiochus 13